Mitts is a surname. Notable people with the surname include:

Emma Mitts, alderman of the 37th ward of the City of Chicago
Harry Mitts, defendant in Bobby v. Mitts 2010 term per curiam opinion of the Supreme Court of the United States
Heather Mitts (born 1978), American professional soccer player 
Brian "Mitts" Daniels, guitarist of Madball

See also
 Mitt (disambiguation)